Santana de Parnaíba is a city and municipality in the state of São Paulo in Brazil. It is part of the Metropolitan Region of São Paulo. It was founded in 1625 near the Tietê River by Susana Dias, an important Bandeirante (Brazilian pioneers) wife. It was the birthplace of prominent Bandeirante Domingos Jorge Velho.

The word Parnaíba means rocky river.

The municipality contains and administers the  Tamboré Biological Reserve, a strictly protected conservation unit.

References

Municipalities in São Paulo (state)
Populated places established in 1625
1625 establishments in the Portuguese Empire